Mosaisk Vestre Begravelsesplads is a Jewish cemetery in Copenhagen.

Notable interments
 Victor Borge (1909–2000), US/Danish conductor, pianist, and comedian. Part of his ashes are buried here, the remainder at Putnam Cemetery, Greenwich, Connecticut, US.
 Abraham Kurland (1912–1999), Danish wrestler, won silver at the 1932 Summer Olympics boycotted the Berlin Olympics, and competed in the 1948 Summer Olympics
 Herman Trier (1845–1925), Danish educator and politician

References

External links
 

Cemeteries in Copenhagen
Jewish cemeteries
Judaism in Copenhagen